Singaporean Chinese may refer to:
 Chinese Singaporeans, the citizens or residents of Singapore who are of Chinese ancestry
 Singaporean Mandarin, the dialect of Mandarin Chinese spoken in Singapore
 Singaporean Hokkien, historically the largest vernacular of the Singapore Chinese

See also
 Malaysian Mandarin

Language and nationality disambiguation pages